The 2022 Tour de France was the 109th edition of the Tour de France. It started in Copenhagen, Denmark on 1 July and ended with the final stage at Champs-Élysées, Paris on 24 July.

Classification standings

Stage 1 
1 July 2022 – Copenhagen (Denmark), 

The course was pan-flat, with the only intermediate time check taking place after . The course was also technical, featuring more than 20 corners. Rain also greeted the riders, particularly among the first half of starters.

Jérémy Lecroq was the first rider off the start ramp. The first rider to set a benchmark time was Bauke Mollema, the Dutch time trial champion, with a time of 15' 34". Shortly after, his time was beaten by Mathieu van der Poel, who went four seconds faster than Mollema; he was on the hot seat for some time. Three riders came close to beating his time as Mads Pedersen and 's pair of general classification (GC) leaders, Jonas Vingegaard and Primož Roglič, were two to three seconds slower than van der Poel. After a few minutes, the world champion, Filippo Ganna came out on the course. He was a second slower at the time check but he eventually finished with a time of 15' 27", knocking van der Poel off the hot seat. Less than a minute later, Wout van Aert quickly beat Ganna as he finished with a time of 15' 22". The two-time defending champion, Tadej Pogačar challenged van Aert's time but he fell short by two seconds. The only rider to beat van Aert was Yves Lampaert. Lampaert was two seconds slower than van Aert at the time check but he ended up finishing with a time of 15' 17". No one came close to beating his time as Lampaert took his first Tour stage and the first maillot jaune of the race. He also took the points jersey while Pogačar took the young riders jersey.

Amongst the  contenders, Pogačar was the fastest, eight and nine seconds ahead of Vingegaard and Roglič, respectively. The rest of the potential contenders finished between 16 seconds to almost a minute behind the Slovenian.

Stage 2 
2 July 2022 – Roskilde to Nyborg (Denmark), 

The first road stage of the Tour featured a  flat parcours from Roskilde to Nyborg, with the stage expected to end in a bunch sprint. The first half of the stage featured three fourth-category climbs, offering opportunities for the riders to take the first polka-dot jersey. Following the intermediate sprint in Kalundborg after  of racing, the riders rode along the coast before reaching the  Great Belt Bridge with  left. The coast and the exposed bridge offered an opportunity for the peloton to split into echelons. After getting off the bridge, there were only around  until the finish.

Immediately following the stage's official start, Magnus Cort, Sven Erik Bystrøm, and the  duo of Pierre Rolland and Cyril Barthe took off from the peloton. The quartet gained a maximum advantage of two minutes before the sprinters' teams began to control the peloton. Cort took the King of the Mountain (KoM) points at the top of the three fourth-category climbs to become the virtual wearer of the polka-dot jersey. Meanwhile, Rolland and Barthe were dropped on the first climb as Cort and Bystrøm, whose lead over the peloton increased to over three minutes, pushed on at the front. As the riders headed towards the intermediate sprint, the duo's lead rapidly decreased to less than a minute. As Cort and Bystrøm took maximum points at the sprint, Caleb Ewan took the points for third in the peloton, just ahead of Wout van Aert. With  to go, Bystrøm left Cort behind. He hovered at the front of the race until there were  left when he was caught by the peloton. For his efforts, Bystrøm was awarded the combativity award.

Just before the riders reached the Great Belt bridge, Rigoberto Urán and Kevin Vermaerke went down in a crash; both riders eventually made it back. On the bridge, a group of riders were involved in a crash, including the maillot jaune wearer, Yves Lampaert. No one was seriously injured, and they were able to return to the peloton. Echelons did not materialise due to a cross-headwind and the peloton remained together until the finale. With just under  remaining, another crash took down several riders. Most of the contenders were caught behind the crash but everyone avoided losing time due to the  rule. The stage was decided by a reduced bunch sprint containing all the big sprinters. Mads Pedersen was the first to launch his sprint. He was passed by van Aert but a late surge by Fabio Jakobsen gave him his first Tour stage win. Despite finishing second, van Aert took the maillot jaune by virtue of six bonus seconds and he also took the green points jersey.

Stage 3 
3 July 2022 – Vejle to Sønderborg (Denmark), 

The third stage was the last stage in Denmark and featured a  parcours that took the riders from Vejle to Sønderborg near the German border. The course was flat, and a bunch sprint was expected at the finish.

Like the previous day, there was no fight for the break as Magnus Cort, the wearer of the polka-dot jersey, went up the road as the sole rider in the breakaway. The peloton allowed him to build a maximum advantage of just over six minutes before starting to chase. Cort once again took the  points at all three climbs to extend his lead in the  classification. At the intermediate sprint with  left, after Cort took the maximum points, Wout van Aert, the leader of the points classification, took the points for second ahead of Fabio Jakobsen. Cort stayed out front until there were  remaining when the peloton finally made the catch.

Over the final part of the stage, the peloton continued to set a steady pace as the sprinters' teams began to set up their lead-outs while the  teams kept their leaders safe. While no one was seriously injured, some  contenders, notably Rigoberto Urán and the  pair of Damiano Caruso and Jack Haig, were not able to get back to the peloton and eventually lost 39 seconds on the day. In the final sprint, van Aert started his sprint first. He held the lead in the final metres until Dylan Groenewegen pipped him at the line, taking his first World Tour victory in over two years. A fast finishing Jasper Philipsen took third while Peter Sagan finished fourth after being blocked near the barriers. Despite finishing second for the third day in a row, van Aert kept the maillot jaune, extending his  lead to seven seconds over Yves Lampaert ahead of the first rest day as the race travelled back to France.

Transfer 
4 July 2022

Tour transferred from Sønderborg (Denmark) to Dunkirk.

Stage 4 
5 July 2022 – Dunkirk to Calais, 

Following the first rest day, the fourth stage of the Tour featured an undulating parcours from Dunkirk to Calais. For the first , the terrain was mostly flat with one fourth-category climb on the way. Afterwards, the riders faced a rolling terrain that featured five fourth-category climbs. The climb featured an opportunity for the riders to drop the pure sprinters. Following the descent, the rest of the stage was entirely flat. The intermediate sprint was located in Lumbres after  of racing.

From the stage's official start, Magnus Cort went into the break for the third successive stage. This time, he was accompanied by Anthony Perez. Both riders gained a maximum advantage of over six and a half minutes before  began to chase. At one point,  split the peloton into echelons but the group eventually came back together. Up front, Cort took the  points on the first five climbs to further extend his lead in the  classification, taking the record of most consecutive summits won, from former Tour champion and multi-time mountains classification winner Federico Bahamontes. As the riders passed through the intermediate sprint, the breakaway duo took the maximum points while Fabio Jakobsen outsprinted Wout van Aert for the third place points. As the break's lead gradually decreased, Perez dropped Cort with just under  left. He continued to hold the lead, but his advantage was down to less than 20 seconds ahead of the final climb, the Côte du Cap Blanc-Nez.

On the climb,  lit up the race by setting a ferocious tempo, quickly passing by Perez. The peloton split into pieces due to the pace. Halfway up the climb, the front group was down to just van Aert, his teammate Jonas Vingegaard, and Adam Yates. Towards the top, van Aert pulled away solo in pursuit of the stage win. His advantage quickly grew to around half a minute over a reformed peloton. Several teams attempted to bring back the maillot jaune but van Aert soloed to the stage win. Jasper Philipsen led the peloton across the line eight seconds later, with the Belgian mistakenly celebrating after having thought he won the stage. There were no other changes in the top ten ahead of the Tour's cobbled stage.

Stage 5 
6 July 2022 – Lille to Arenberg, 

The fifth stage of the Tour featured a  parcours that took the riders from Lille to Arenberg. For the first time since 2018, cobbles returned to the route of the race. The stage featured 11 cobbled sectors totalling  and five new sectors that were not previously featured in the Tour or Paris–Roubaix. The first half of the stage had no cobbled sectors, with the intermediate sprint in Mérignies after  the only point of interest. After  of racing, the riders faced the first sector of cobbles. The other ten sectors of cobbles were scattered in the final  of the stage. The last cobbled sector was tackled with  left before the run-in to the finish in Arenberg.

A few kilometres following the stage's official start, Magnus Cort, Taco van der Hoorn, and Edvald Boasson Hagen managed to build a gap over the peloton. They were soon joined by Cort's teammate, Neilson Powless, Simon Clarke, and Alexis Gougeard, who counter-attacked from the peloton. The best-placed rider in the break was Powless, who was only 1' 13" behind Wout van Aert. The break's lead was at over three minutes at its maximum as they headed towards the cobbles. Although their advantage continued to decrease towards the rest of the day, the sextet managed to maintain their lead all the way to the line. After Gougeard and Cort were dropped at separate times, the stage win was decided by the four remaining breakaway riders. Towards the final kilometre, Powless attacked and although he built a gap, he was chased down by Boasson Hagen. However, Clarke and van der Hoorn passed the Norwegian, with Clarke narrowly beating van der Hoorn in the sprint to win the stage.

They eventually got back to the peloton ahead of the first cobbled sector, sector 11. Mads Pedersen and Jack Bauer attacked after sector 11, but they were eventually brought back. After riding through sector 10, Ben O'Connor suffered a puncture. He ended up losing four minutes by the end of the day. Over the next set of cobbled sectors, multiple riders crashed and suffered mechanicals, but no one was seriously injured. Just after sector 6, Jonas Vingegaard had a mechanical. He underwent three bike changes and by the time he started chasing, he was more than a minute down on the group of favourites.

After the peloton passed through sector 5, another crash took down several riders, with Primož Roglič among those involved. He dislocated his shoulder and had to pop his shoulder back in before getting back on the bike. Also involved in the crash was Jack Haig, who was forced to abandon the race. On sector 3, the last four-star sector, Jasper Stuyven attacked together with Tadej Pogačar, the two-time defending champion. The pair came to within less than 40 seconds of catching the breakaway, but that was the closest they would get. Stuyven and Pogačar stayed clear of the peloton, finishing 51 seconds down on Clarke. The main peloton, which included Vingegaard and most of the  favourites, finished 13 seconds behind the pair. Meanwhile, Roglič ended up losing more than two minutes to Pogačar.

Pogačar reduced his deficit to 19 seconds with his time gains, with Vingegaard the closest  contender at 21 seconds down on the Slovenian.

Stage 6 
7 July 2022 – Binche (Belgium) to Longwy, 

The sixth stage featured the longest stage of the race, with the riders traversing a  parcours from Binche to Longwy. The first two-thirds of the stage were mostly flat, apart from some small hills and a single third-category climb. In the final  of the stage, the riders faced four consecutive small climbs on the way to the finish. After a fourth-category climb and an uncategorised climb, the riders tackled the third-category Côte de Pulventeux, an  climb with an average of 12.3 per cent that peaked with  left. A short descent led to the final climb to the finish in Longwy, with the final  averaging 5.8 per cent.

The start of the stage was marked by a furious fight for the breakaway. Initially, a three-man group containing Taco van der Hoorn, Toms Skujiņš, and Benoît Cosnefroy gained a minute on the peloton before being chased down. A 10-man break also got a gap, but they were brought back. After van Aert took maximum points at the intermediate sprint, Fuglsang decided to drop back to the peloton with  left, leaving van Aert and Simmons out front. Both riders continued to work together but their advantage gradually dwindled.

With  remaining, van Aert dropped Simmons with the peloton at just over a minute behind. The maillot jaune continued with his ride until he was caught with  left. He quickly dropped back from the peloton, ensuring the maillot jaune would change hands at the end of the day. With  to go, there was a crash that involved Aleksandr Vlasov and a couple other riders. All riders got back on the bike with Vlasov trying to limit his losses. On the Côte de Pulventeux, Alexis Vuillermoz attacked and gained a small gap on the reduced peloton. The  duo of Rafał Majka and Brandon McNulty led out their leader, Tadej Pogačar, into the final hundred metres before Primož Roglič started his sprint. Pogačar launched his sprint behind his compatriot's slipstream, getting a small gap to win the stage. Michael Matthews took second while David Gaudu finished third. Most of the contenders finished in the front group while Vlasov and Geraint Thomas finished in a group five seconds down. Meanwhile, Damiano Caruso lost 26 seconds and Ben O'Connor finished over two and a half minutes back. With his win and the bonus seconds he gained, Pogačar took the maillot jaune, four seconds ahead of Neilson Powless and 31 seconds ahead of Jonas Vingegaard, just before the Tour's first mountain stage.

Stage 7 
8 July 2022 – Tomblaine to La Planche des Belles Filles, 

The seventh stage took the riders from Tomblaine to La Super Planche des Belles Filles for the first summit finish of the race. The first half of the stage was mostly flat before the riders went on a false flat uphill to the intermediate sprint in Gérardmer with  left. The last part of the stage featured hilly terrain, with the riders tackling the third-category climbs of Col de Grosse Pierre and Col des Croix as well as two uncategorised climbs. The last climb of the day was La Super Planche des Belles Filles, which was ridden for the sixth time in the last ten years. This edition featured the extended gravel section in the final kilometre, which was first seen in the Tour in 2019, with a 24 percent section located near the finish.

Like the previous day, there was another furious fight for the break with the peloton going on another fast start. Some riders tried to bridge to the front group, but no one was able to get to the break. They built a maximum advantage of two and a half minutes before  began to chase. Vegard Stake Laengen was originally part of the break but he soon dropped back with his team trying to chase the break. At the intermediate sprint, the ten-man break took maximum points while Wout van Aert took the sprint from the peloton to extend his lead in the points classification. On the first categorised climb of the day, the  duo of Max Schachmann and Lennard Kämna attacked from the break, with five other riders bridging up to them to make it seven out front. At this point, the peloton was around three minutes behind the break, with the gap stabilizing until there were less than  left.

As the peloton neared the final climb of La Super Planche des Belles Filles, the pace increased with the fight for position ahead of the climb, causing the break's lead to gradually decrease. At the bottom of the final climb, Simon Geschke attacked from the break, with Dylan Teuns and Kämna chasing him a few metres back. With  to go, Kämna left Teuns behind and bridged up to Geschke. A few seconds later, Kämna dropped Geschke to solo off the front. George Bennett and Rafał Majka continued to set the tempo until their  leader, Tadej Pogačar, accelerated just under the flamme rouge, with a select group of contenders following him. Pogačar kept the tempo up until Jonas Vingegaard attacked with less than  left and only the maillot jaune can follow his move. Both riders passed Kämna and although Vingegaard gapped Pogačar by a bike length, Pogačar managed to launch a final sprint to win the stage over Vingegaard. Primož Roglič finished third at 12 seconds down while Geraint Thomas finished with Kämna at 14 seconds down. Most of the contenders lost somewhere between 19 seconds and more than a minute down. Aleksandr Vlasov, one of the podium contenders, lost 1' 39" while Jakob Fuglsang and Ben O'Connor dropped out of  contention after losing 5' 17" and 6' 45", respectively.

Thomas moved up to third at 1' 10" down with his teammate, Adam Yates, just a further eight seconds down. The rest of the top ten were between a minute and a half and almost two minutes behind, separated by only 24 seconds.

Stage 8 
9 July 2022 – Dole to Lausanne (Switzerland), 

The eighth stage featured a hilly terrain that took the riders from Dole to Lausanne in Switzerland. The first  was entirely flat before an uncategorised climb led to the intermediate sprint at Montrond after  of racing. Following the intermediate sprint, the riders headed into the hills, tackling the fourth-category Côte du Maréchet and the third-category Côte des Rousses back-to-back. The riders then rode on a plateau section as the race headed into Switzerland before tackling the fourth-category Col de Pétra Félix, which peaked with  left. The climb had a flat section in the middle before the road went uphill again at an average gradient of 9.5 percent. The steep section continued before a  flat section to the finish line.

A few kilometres after the stage started, a three-man break containing Mattia Cattaneo, Fred Wright, and Frederik Frison went away. Shortly after the group got away, there was a crash near the back of the peloton. The crash involved  contenders such as Tadej Pogačar, Geraint Thomas, Romain Bardet, and David Gaudu, but all of them escaped unscathed. However, Kevin Vermaerke had to abandon as a result of the crash. At the intermediate sprint, the trio up front took maximum points while in the peloton, Jasper Philipsen outsprinted Wout van Aert for the remaining maximum points. With around  remaining, Frison was dropped from the break, leaving Cattaneo and Wright in front. Around this point, the peloton continued to stabilise the break's gap as they avoided to catch them too early.

On the lead-up to the final climb of the day, the breakaway duo's lead gradually decreased as the teams fought for position at the front of the peloton. Wright continued to dangle at the front until he was caught with  left. Leading into the final kilometre, Rafał Majka led the peloton, with his teammate and the maillot jaune, Pogačar, on his wheel. Majka continued to lead it out until Guillaume Martin took over at the front. Michael Matthews soon started his sprint, with Pogačar on his wheel, but van Aert overtook both riders to win his second stage of the race. With 50 points for the stage win, van Aert extended his lead in the points classification to 115 points over Fabio Jakobsen. Matthews took second place on the stage while Pogačar finished third, taking four bonus seconds in the process.

Stage 9 
10 July 2022 – Aigle (Switzerland) to Châtel, 

The race entered the Alps on stage nine as the riders travelled from Aigle to Châtel. The first  was completely flat before the riders tackled the fourth-category Côte de Bellevue. After passing through the intermediate sprint at Semsales after , the riders went through a flat valley section before tackling the second-category Col des Mosses. A descent and a short valley section led to the foot of the first-category Col de la Croix, an  climb with an average of 7.6 percent. At the top of the climb, there were  left. The climb was summitted with  left. There was a short descent before the riders tackled a  uncategorised climb that averaged 4.5 percent, with the climb going all the way to the finish.

The start of the stage was marked by multiple attacks as several riders attempted to go into the break. It took around  before a group of 16 riders went up the road. A few kilometres later, a group of seven riders, including the points classification leader, Wout van Aert, soon bridged up to the front group to make it 23 riders in the break. The group gained a maximum advantage of around three minutes before  began to pace in the peloton. At the intermediate sprint, van Aert took maximum points to further extend his lead in the points classification. At the top of the second-category Col des Mosses, Pierre Latour attacked to get the maximum  points, with Simon Geschke just behind him. On the first-category Col de la Croix, riders continued dropping from the break as Latour launched another attack. He got a gap and was soon joined by Geschke, who took the maximum  points to take the polka-dot jersey.

On the descent, Jungels distanced Geschke as he pushed on alone. His advantage grew to around two minutes over the chase group just before the climb of Pas de Morgins. With around  left, Thibaut Pinot attacked from the chase group. He was joined by Jonathan Castroviejo, Carlos Verona, and Urán. Shortly after, Pinot launched another attack, going solo in pursuit of Jungels. Towards the top, Pinot came to within 20 seconds of catching Jungels while Castroviejo and Verona, who had dropped Urán, were around 20 seconds further in arrears. Despite Pinot's best efforts to chase, Jungels maintained his advantage on the final uncategorised climb to win his first Tour stage. In the final kilometre, Pinot was passed by Castroviejo and Verona, who took second and third on the stage, respectively.

Meanwhile, the peloton continued to go at a steady pace throughout the stage. On the Pas de Morgins, Aleksandr Vlasov and Daniel Martínez were unable to follow the pace. Vlasov limited his losses to around half a minute while Martínez ended up losing 15 minutes to drop out of  contention. Near the finish, the maillot jaune, Tadej Pogačar, sprinted for time gaps, with Jonas Vingegaard following him. Pogačar and Vingegaard took fifth and sixth, respectively, at 49 seconds behind Jungels and three seconds ahead of the group of  contenders. Pogačar kept the maillot jaune ahead of the race's second rest day.

Rest day 1 
11 July 2022 – Morzine

Stage 10 
12 July 2022 – Morzine to Megève, 

Following the second rest day, the race continued in the Alps with a hilly stage that took the riders from Morzine to Megève. The stage started with a descent for the first  before the riders went up the fourth-category Côte de Chevenoz. After the descent, the riders went uphill before tackling the third-category Col de Jambaz, which topped after  of racing. Another gradual descent led the riders to the fourth-category Côte de Châtillon-sur-Cluses. Afterwards, the riders faced a flat section towards the intermediate sprint in Passy-Marlioz with  left. Shortly after, the riders faced the second-category Montée de l'altiport de Megève, a  climb with an average of 4.1 percent. There were around  left at the top of the climb but the road kept going uphill all the way to the finish.

No riders immediately attacked from the start as the riders negotiated the initial descent. Eventually, a furious fight for the break unfolded as several riders attempted to make it into the move. The break was allowed to increase their lead to as much as nine and a half minutes, which meant that Kämna was the virtual maillot jaune at some points during the stage.

He gained a lead of around half a minute on his breakaway companions before the race was neutralised due to a group of climate change protesters blocking the road. Some riders and media noted that they were "protesting about a good thing", and others expressed annoyance at the disruption to the race, with former rider Bradley Wiggins calling protesters "imbeciles". All riders were ordered to stop but as the protesters were removed, all the gaps before the neutralization were reestablished. Bettiol increased his lead to almost a minute but his advantage gradually dwindled ahead of the final climb to Megève.

On the climb, there were multiple attacks in the chase group, with several riders getting dropped from the break. Around  from the finish, Bettiol was caught, with seven other riders joining him while the other groups of breakaway riders were scattered on the climb. Immediately afterwards, Bettiol attacked again and this time, he was joined by Georg Zimmermann. However, their attack did not stick as they were caught by a group of ten chasers. With around  left, Luis León Sánchez attacked, gaining an advantage of more than 20 seconds on the chase group. He would soon be joined by Matteo Jorgenson and Nick Schultz as they reached the top of the climb. Dylan van Baarle bridged up to the front ahead of the flamme rouge but as the quartet looked at each other, a group of six chasers managed to come back to the front. Van Baarle and Benjamin Thomas attempted to attack at separate times inside the final kilometre but they were caught. With  left, Sánchez started his sprint but he was passed by Schultz and Magnus Cort, with Cort pipping Schultz to take the stage. In the  group, there were no attacks as the contenders looked ahead to the big mountain stages the next two days. Pogačar kept the maillot jaune by a margin of 11 seconds over Kämna, who gained eight and a half minutes after finishing tenth on the stage.

Stage 11 
13 July 2022 – Albertville to Col du Granon, 

The eleventh stage took the riders into the high mountains, with the race tackling the Col du Granon for the first of two consecutive summit finishes. The Tour climbed the Col du Granon for the first time since 1986. The first  was completely flat, with the riders passing through the intermediate sprint in Aiguebelle after  of racing. Afterwards, the riders tackled the second-category Lacets de Montvernier, a  climb with an average of 8.2 percent. After a short descent, the riders immediately climbed the first hors categorie climb of the race, the Col du Galibier. Following a long descent, the riders tackled the final climb, the hors categorie Col du Granon, an  climb with an average of 9.2 percent.

Following the stage's official start, there was an initial attack by Wout van Aert and Mathieu van der Poel. Both riders held an advantage as they passed through the intermediate sprint where van Aert took maximum points. They were soon joined by Mattia Cattaneo before a group of 17 riders bridged up to the lead group ahead of Lacets de Montvernier. The break of 20 riders was allowed to build an advantage of nine minutes as  kept a steady pace at the front of the peloton. At the Col du Télégraphe, the break began to dwindle in number as 11 riders were left up front. Meanwhile, in the peloton,  began to set up their plan as Primož Roglič launched two separate attacks on the Télégraphe. After his second attack, only the maillot jaune of Tadej Pogačar, Jonas Vingegaard, and Geraint Thomas were able to follow him. With the gap at over half a minute on the rest of the peloton, Roglič and Vingegaard began to repeatedly attack Pogačar, but the maillot jaune, as well as Thomas, were able to respond each time. Eventually, Pogačar's teammate, Marc Soler, managed to bridge up to the maillot jaune group, setting a steady pace before the rest of the reduced peloton got back to the group.

On the Col du Galibier, the break continued to drop riders as only van Aert, Warren Barguil, Simon Geschke, Dylan Teuns, and Pierre Latour were left in the lead group. With  left, Barguil attacked, dropping the rest of his breakaway companions. He gradually increased his gap on the way to taking the Souvenir Henri Desgrange, with Geschke passing the summit of the Galibier at almost a minute down. In the peloton,  began attacking Pogačar once again in an attempt to isolate him. Pogačar responded by increasing the pace, with only Vingegaard able to follow him. The duo crossed the top of Galibier at four and a half minutes down on Barguil. On the descent, there was a regrouping as the other contenders came back. The contenders began looking at each other until van Aert, who dropped back from the break, began to pace the group. The Belgian decreased Barguil's lead to around three and a half minutes before the riders reached the Col du Granon.

On Col du Granon, Rafał Majka began to set a steady tempo, dropping contenders such as Roglič, David Gaudu, Tom Pidcock, Aleksandr Vlasov, and Alexey Lutsenko. Quintana passed the remnants of the breakaway as he got closer to his teammate, Barguil. A few kilometres later, Romain Bardet also attacked in pursuit of Quintana, who managed to pass Barguil. Majka kept pacing the maillot jaune group before Vingegaard launched his attack with  left. Pogačar was unable to respond as Vingegaard passed both Bardet and Quintana. The Dane continued to increase his lead all the way to the line while Pogačar suffered, with Thomas, Gaudu, and Adam Yates passing and dropping the Slovenian. Vingegaard soloed to his first Tour stage win, 59 seconds ahead of Quintana. Bardet, Thomas, Gaudu, and Yates finished between 1' 10" and 2' 10" behind while Pogačar ended up losing 2' 51".

There were massive changes on  due to the results of the stage. Vingegaard took the maillot jaune, 2' 16" ahead of Bardet, who rose to second. Pogačar dropped to third, a further six seconds behind. Thomas, Quintana, Yates, and Gaudu also sit within less than a minute of Bardet in second. Vlasov and Lutsenko entered the top ten after limiting their losses while Enric Mas rounded out the top ten at 9' 29" down on Vingegaard.

References 

2022 Tour de France
Tour de France stages